The 1951 Valparaiso Crusaders football team was an American football team that represented Valparaiso University as a member of the Indiana Collegiate Conference (ICC) during the 1951 college football season. Led by sixth-year head coach Emory Bauer, the Crusaders compiled an overall record of 9–0 with a mark of 4–0 in conference play, winning the ICC title.

Schedule

References

Valparaiso
Valparaiso Beacons football seasons
College football undefeated seasons
Valparaiso Crusaders football